Wulf Brunner (born 20 March 1962) is a retired West German discus thrower.

Biography
He competed at the Olympic Games in 1988 without reaching the final.

His personal best throw was 66.42 metres, achieved in July 1988 in Kassel. He represented the sports club TV Gelnhausen.

Achievements

References

1962 births
Living people
West German male discus throwers
Athletes (track and field) at the 1988 Summer Olympics
Olympic athletes of West Germany